Vrochitsa is a settlement in the municipal unit of Iardanos, Greece. It is situated in a valley surrounded by low hills, at 80 m elevation. It is 2 km southwest of Elaionas, 2 km east of Fonaitika, 4 km east of Vounargo and 7 km north of Pyrgos. Its population is 359 people (2011 census). There is an elementary school, a church and a square.

Population

See also

List of settlements in Elis

External links
Vrochitsa at the GTP Travel Pages

References

Iardanos
Populated places in Elis